Lathecla is a Neotropical genus of butterfly in the family Lycaenidae.

References

Eumaeini
Lycaenidae of South America
Lycaenidae genera